Konstantin Martazov (1919 – 1993) was a Soviet sports shooter. He competed in the 50 m pistol event at the 1952 Summer Olympics.

References

1919 births
1993 deaths
Soviet male sport shooters
Olympic shooters of the Soviet Union
Shooters at the 1952 Summer Olympics
Place of birth missing